Fabijan Šovagović (4 January 1932 – 1 January 2001) was a Croatian film, television and theatre actor, and writer.

Biography
Šovagović was born in the village of Ladimirevci, in the Slavonia region of Croatia, then Kingdom of Yugoslavia. He began acting in his youth and from the late 1950s he appeared in many films, becoming one of the most recognisable faces of Croatian and former Yugoslav cinema. He never became a star, but he built a reputation as one of the greatest character actors with memorable roles in many classic films and popular television series. Matija Gubec, whom he played in 1975 film Seljačka buna, is one of his rare starring roles.

In 1979 he played the role of a Dervish in Meetings with Remarkable Men, directed by Peter Brook.

Šovagović was also active in theatre and those experiences led him to begin writing plays of his own. The best known of them all is Sokol ga nije volio ("Sokol Did Not Love Him"), later adapted in 1988 film. It was his movie about his birthplace, Ladimirevci.

His most unforgettable last role was of a Slavonian refugee man in the 1994 movie Vukovar se vraća kući ("Vukovar: The Way Home"). A man lost everything in war except his loving companion dog, and shares destiny of many of his fellow citizens who are exiled from the Slavonian town of Vukovar.

Many believe his brilliant reflection of this tragic Slavonian character was due to a fact that Šovagović being a native Slavonian Croat, have known this feeling firsthand himself.
Šovagović played brilliant role of policeman (Žandar) in television series "Kuda idu divlje svinje?" (Where Do Wild Boars Go?).

Through the last years of his life, Šovagović struggled with the consequences of heart strokes. He died in Zagreb, on 1 January 2001, aged 68.

Personal life
Šovagović married Maja Blaškov, with whom he had two children; a daughter, Anja, and a son, Filip, both actors.

His son, Filip, was a leading character in No Man's Land, a 2001 Oscar-winning Bosnian movie. They are both followed his footsteps and became well accredited movie and theater actors.

Selected filmography

Svoga tela gospodar (1957)
H-8... (1958) – Franjo Rošić
Dvostruki obruč (1963)
Službeni položaj (1964) – Radnik u pogonu
Prometej s otoka Viševice (1964) – Vinko
The Key (1965) - Marko (segment "Čekati")
Druga strana medalje (1965) – Ustaški policajac
Monday or Tuesday (1966) – Golubar Boltek
Breza (1967) – Joza Sveti
Illusion (1967) – Kolega s faksa
Crne ptice (1967)
Gravitacija ili fantastična mladost činovnika Borisa Horvata (1968) – Pijanac
I Have Two Mothers and Two Fathers (1968) – Drugi tata
When You Hear the Bells (1969) - Mican
Događaj (1969) – Matijević
Slučajni zivot (1969) – TV novinar
Battle of Neretva (1969) – Boško
The Fed One (1970) – Apostol
Lisice (1970) – Ante
U gori raste zelen bor (1971) - Lazo
Ovcar (1971) – Perica
Makedonski del od pekolot (1971) – Bugarski polkovnik
Short Night of Glass Dolls (1971) – Professor Karting
Lov na jelene (1972) – Zdravko
Prvi splitski odred (1972) – Sudac
Majstor i Margarita (1972) – Berlioz
Deveto čudo na istoku (1972)
To Live on Love (1973) – Direktor škole
Scalawag (1973) – Blackfoot
Deps (1974) – Dežurni sudija
A Performance of Hamlet in the Village of Mrdusa Donja (1974) – Učitelj Andro
Pokoj, rci, jad (1975)
The House (1975) – Branko
Anno Domini 1573 (1975) – Matija Gubec
Četiri dana do smrti (1976) – Dr. Bedeković
The Rat Savior (1976) – Professor Martin Bošković
A Shot (1977) – Pajo Bradić
Ne naginji se van (1977) – Mate
Snowstorm (1977) – Žandar
Meetings with Remarkable Men (1979) – Dervish
Novinar (1979) – Stanko Kos
Povratak (1979) – Barba Pave
Usijanje (1979) – Ante
Daj sto das (1979)
Olovna brigada (1980)
Rhythm of a Crime (1981) – Fabijan
Dvije polovine srca (1982) – Sudija
Hoću živjeti (1982) – Marko Mlinarić
Zločin u školi (1982) – Direktor
Servantes iz Malog Mista (1982) – Tajnik MZ
Medeni mjesec (1983) – Čika Sima
The Ambassador (1984) – Majstor centralnog grijanja
Mala pljačka vlaka (1984) – Grof Andrej Tihonov
Horvat's Choice (1985) – Lazar Margitić 'Lazo'
I to će proći (1985) – Isidor Katanić 'Zeko'
Un foro nel parabrezza (1985) – Marito di Daniza
Crveni i crni (1985) – Petar Perbako
San o ruži (1986) – Laci
Na putu za Katangu (1987) – Upravnik Janković
Osuđeni (1987) – Pero
Hi-Fi (1987) – Boris Bojanovski
My Uncle's Legacy (1988) – Martinov djed
Sokol Did Not Love Him (1988) – Sima
Čovjek koji je volio sprovode (1989) – Gabrek
Diploma za smrt (1989) – Pavel
Povratak Katarine Kožul (1989)
Hamburg Altona (1989)
Silent Gunpowder (1990) – Pop Novak
Ljeto za sjećanje (1990) – Ujak
Orao (1990) – Kristofic
Čaruga (1991) – Brico
Đuka Begović (1991) – Sima
Vukovar: The Way Home (1994) – Baja
The Third Woman (1997) – Funtak

Bibliography
 Glumčevi zapisi (1977, 1979) 
 Sokol ga nije volio (1981, 1986, 2003)
 Divani Fabe Šovagova (1996)

Discography
 Pokraj Karašice selo malo (1985)

References

External links
 

1932 births
2001 deaths
Croatian male actors
Croatian dramatists and playwrights
Vladimir Nazor Award winners
Burials at Mirogoj Cemetery
20th-century dramatists and playwrights
20th-century Croatian male actors